Haftoni (also, Gaftoni) is a village and municipality in the Lankaran Rayon of Azerbaijan. It has a population of 2,685. The municipality consists of the villages of Haftoni, Talışlı, and Xanlıqlı.

References 

Populated places in Lankaran District